Pol-e Band (also Romanized as Pol Band; also known as Pūlband) is a village in Dasht-e Taybad Rural District, Miyan Velayat District, Taybad County, Razavi Khorasan Province, Iran. At the 2006 census, its population was 2,092, in 440 families.

References 

Populated places in Taybad County